Aku Raski, known by his stage name Huoratron, is a Finnish electronic music artist. Active since 2003, he is known for several releases such as "Prevenge", "$$ Troopers", and "Corporate Occult". He has also done a remix of HIM's "In Venere Veritas". In 2010 he signed with Last Gang Records and released his first full-length album entitled "Cryptocracy."

Discography

Albums
2012: Cryptocracy (CD, Last Gang)
2017: XXVI Crimes of Love (CD, Last Gang)

EPs
2008: $$ Troopers (12" / CD, New Judas)
2009: Corporate Occult (12" / CD, New Judas)

Singles
2008: $$ Troopers (12" single, New Judas)

Remix

 Mixhell "Highly Explicit"
 Hermanos Inglesos "Take Me Down"
 Teenage Bad Girl "Keep Up With You"
 M.I.A. "Internet Connection"
 HIM "In Venere Veritas"
 Crystal Castles "Sad Eyes"
 Death from Above 1979 "Crystal Ball"

References

External links 

 www.LastGangManagement.com
 www.LastGangEntertainment.com
 www.Huoratron.com
 Huoratron - last.fm artist profile

Finnish electronic music groups
Musical groups established in 2008